The 16th International 500-Mile Sweepstakes Race was held at the Indianapolis Motor Speedway on Wednesday, May 30, 1928. This was the first Indianapolis 500 presided over by new Speedway president Eddie Rickenbacker. Rain threatened to wash out the day, but the showers stopped and the race started on time. One brief shower slowed the race around the 400-mile mark, bringing out the yellow flag for a few laps.

It was the third year contested with the supercharged 91 cu. in. (1.5 L) displacement engine formula. A total of seven supercharged front-wheel drive cars were entered, and they swept the front row during time trials. Duray dominated much of the first half of the race, setting a blistering pace. He dropped out in the second half, however, due to an overheating engine.

With twenty laps to go, Tony Gulotta led Jimmy Gleason and Louis Meyer. All three cars were running nose-to-tail. On lap 181, Gulotta slowed with a leaking fuel tank and a clogged fuel line. Gleason and Meyer then battled for the lead. On lap 196 Gleason headed for the pits to take on water for the radiator. A crew member missed the radiator and accidentally doused the car's magneto with water. The engine was ruined with a cracked water jacket in sight of victory.

Rookie driver Louis Meyer (though he had appeared as a relief driver in 1927) took the first of what would be three career Indy victories. Meyer did not even land his ride until one week before the race. Car owner Phil "Red" Shafer entered a rear-wheel drive Miller Special for Wilbur Shaw with initial backing from a fuel pump manufacturer. The deal fell through, and Shafer abruptly sold the car to Alden Sampson II four days before time trials were scheduled to begin. Sampson hired Louis Meyer to drive the car, the same machine that Tony Gulotta drove to a third place in 1927. Meyer put the car safely in the field in 13th starting position. He drove a steady, consistent pace, and led only once, the final 19 laps of the race. Despite predictions of record speed, and an early blistering pace, Meyer's average speed of 99.482 mph for the 500 miles fell short of the record set in 1926.

Race schedule
The race was scheduled for Wednesday May 30. Competitors began arriving at the grounds in mid-April, and the track was to be made available for practice and testing no later than May 1. Elimination trials were scheduled for three days (May 26–28), but qualifying extended to an additional day (and for a brief period on race  morning) due to a short field. The annual awards banquet was scheduled for Thursday evening (May 31) at the Indianapolis Chamber of Commerce.

Preparations and Practice

April
 Friday April 13: Earl Cooper was entered in a Marmon 68 Special.
 Monday April 16: Frank Lockhart, the 1926 race winner, left Indianapolis for Daytona Beach. Lockhart was preparing to make another attempt at the Land speed record. He was injured in a crash on his previous attempt on February 22. Just days later on April 25, however, while making a pass down Daytona's beach straightaway, the car cut a tire, and crashed violently. Lockhart was thrown from the machine, and killed instantly.
 Friday April 27: Two Duesenberg machines were entered, by A.S. Kirkeby and Harry Maley. The track had been closed all week while crews repaired a dip at the south end. Although no laps had been turned, the garage area was bustling with activity. Among the drivers that had arrived on the grounds were Peter DePaolo, Tommy Milton, Norman Batten, Leon Duray, defending winner George Souders, and numerous others. It was expected that many cars would begin practicing within a week.
 Monday April 30: A Bugatti was entered by William Horn for driver Shorty Cantlon.

May
 Tuesday May 1: The deadline for entries to be received was midnight on May 1. Entries postmarked on or before May 1 would also be honored. As of Tuesday morning, a total of 32 cars had been entered, with between five and ten additional entries expected.
 Wednesday May 2: Last-minute submittals brought the total thus far to 36 cars on the entry list. Earl Cooper added a third Marmon entry one minute before the deadline. his driver would be named at a later date.
 Friday May 4: Activity began to slowly pick up on Friday, as many teams and drivers were now on the grounds. Participants were at the track about a week earlier than previous years, Tom Beall's popular diner was open, and some drivers were exercising by playing sports in the infield or riding bicycles. At least two cars had taken to the track. Leon Duray took laps, as did Peter Kreis in one Earl Cooper's Marmon entries. Meanwhile, Ray Keech arrived at the Speedway searching for a ride, and defending race winner George Souders gave a lecture to engineering students at Purdue University.
 Saturday May 5: Drivers Tony Gulotta and Ray Keech were named to the two cars that belonged to Frank Lockhart.
 Sunday May 6: Ray Keech departed for Philadelphia, but was expected to return mid-week to begin practicing.
 Tuesday May 8: The race purse was announced to be $100,000 with the lap prize fund at $20,000. A total of three-fourths of the lap prizes had been pledged.
 Wednesday May 9: Popular veteran and 1915 race winner Ralph DePalma expressed interest in securing a ride for the race.
 Thursday May 10: Leon Duray was out on the track Thursday turning hot laps. Seen in the garage area prepping their machines were the Bill White team (George Souders), as well as Peter DePaolo and his mechanic Cotton Henning.
 Friday May 11: Among the participants preparing their cars in the garage area was Norman Batten, joined by his brother, Lieutenant Gene Batten, a distinguished pilot. Shorty Cantlon was also on the grounds.
 Saturday May 12: Some drivers including George Souders and Wilbur Shaw departed for a race in Akron.
 Sunday May 13: By the start of third week of practice, a total of 16 cars were housed in the garage area. Another 14 cars were being prepared at nearby locations off site. Of the 33 machines listed on the entry list, 30 had been accounted for. Cars on the track included Louis Schneider (112 mph) and Ira Hall (101 mph). Off the track, fans and participants mourned the death of driver Dave Lewis.
 Monday May 14: Cliff Bergere completed a practice lap at 119.52 mph. Also out on the track were George Souders and Fred Frame.
 Tuesday May 15: The Boyle Valve cars of Cliff Woodbury, Fred Comer, and Dave Evans were expected to arrive in the garage area Tuesday. Woodbury and Comer were slated to drive front-wheel drive machines, while Evans was driving a rear-wheel drive. Halfway through the month of May, the favorites for the race started to include Peter DePaolo, Leon Duray, Peter Kreis, Cliff Woodbury, and Babe Stapp.
 Wednesday May 16: Wilbur Shaw, still without a car to drive, continued to peruse the garage area looking for a ride. Arriving at the track was Odis A. Porter, chief timing official, who was to begin setting up the timing equipment.
 Thursday May 17: Leon Duray set an unofficial one lap track record during a practice run on Thursday. Hand-timed stopwatches clocked Duray with a lap of 1:14.40 (120.95 mph). The lap was slightly quicker than Frank Lockhart's official track record (1:14.43) during time trials in 1927). Other drivers out on the track Thursday afternoon were Peter DePaolo and Cliff Durant. The car of Ray Keech, being prepared by mechanic Jean Marcenac, was expected to take to the bricks when Keech arrived on Sunday.
 Saturday May 19: With just one week before time trials was scheduled to being, several drivers landed rides including Wilbur Shaw, Jimmy Gleason. Zeke Meyer was still looking for a ride, and Ralph Hepburn's car finally arrived at the track.
 Sunday May 20: Louis Schneider, driving with a 122 cid engine cut down to 91.5 cid, drove laps in the range of 109-112 mph. Lacking top speed down the long straights, Schneider was going through the turns faster to keep up his average speed, and it was reportedly very hard on his tires. Earl Devore was out on the track, but did not run any "hot" laps.
 Monday May 21: Ray Keech took his first laps of the month on Monday morning in the Simplex Piston Ring Special. Keech ran seven hot laps in the range of 100-105 mph. Drivers such as Wilbur Shaw and Louis Schneider announced they would attempt to qualify on the first day of elimination trials (Saturday). Of note, driver Dutch Bauman had still not been seen on the track.
 Tuesday May 22: Peter DePaolo ran a practice lap at 114 mph. Ray Keech, in his second day at the track, injured his ankle in a ball game, and would be sidelined for a few days. Approaching time trials, the favorites for the front row included Leon Duray (wh had turned the fastest practice lap of the month), Cliff Bergere, and Peter DePaolo. Two days after landing a ride, Wilbur Shaw was ousted from owner Phil Shafer's rear-wheel drive car and replaced by Louis Meyer. The car was sold Tuesday to Alden Sampson II. Shafer retained driver Babe Stapp in his front-wheel drive machine.
 Wednesday May 23: Leon Duray tested Ralph Hepburn's new car, turning some fast laps until a tire failure forced him to quit. After failing to arrive thus far, driver Prince Ghica and the Cozette Special withdrew, announcing they would not arrive.
 Thursday May 24: With only two days before elimination trials were set to begin, there was a potential that less than a full field of 33 cars would make the starting grid. Kelly Petillo crashed his Eglin Piston Pin Special in turn one. Petillo was uninjured, but the car was too damaged to repair. Also experiencing trouble was Herman Schurch in the Sievers Special, which threw a rod. Of the original 36 entries, the cars of Prince Ghica and Shorty Cantlon were no shows, and with two cars already out, only 32 cars were left. A check around the garage area indicated that at least 23 cars were planning to qualify on Saturday, led by Leon Duray, Cliff Bergere, and Peter DePaolo. Ray Keech broke an exhaust pipe on Thursday, and the crew would have to make quick repairs in order that he would be able to qualify on Saturday.
 Friday May 25: On the eve of time trials, 28 drivers announced they were prepared to make their attempts to qualify. Ray Keech and his mechanic Jean Marcenac worked all day Friday to repair their car's broken exhaust.

Time trials
Qualifications was scheduled for three days, May 26–28. The minimum speed to qualify was set at 90 mph. A total of 36 entries were expected to make attempts to fill the 33 starting positions. Qualified cars on the first day of trials would line up in the grid first, followed by the second day qualifiers, and so on.

Riding mechanics were optional, however, no teams entered utilized them.

Saturday May 26
The first day of elimination trials was held Saturday May 26. Qualifying was scheduled from 1 p.m. to 5 p.m. Any cars in line at 5 o'clock were permitted to make their runs, continuing until the track closed at sundown. The morning dawned dark, with the threat of rain looming, but fair skies prevailed. The existing track records going into the month were both held by Frank Lockhart. The one-lap track record (120.918 mph) and four-lap track record (120.100 mph) were both set during time trials in 1927.

The supercharged front-wheel drive Millers were expected to excel in qualifying, with Leon Duray the favorite for the pole position. Duray had set an unofficial track record on May 17, and was among the fastest cars all month long.

The first driver to challenge the track record was Cliff Woodbury in one of the Boyle Valve Specials owned by Mike Boyle. On his third lap, Woodbury's set a one-lap track record (121.081 mph). His four-lap average of 120.418 mph was also a record. It was noted that this was Woodbury's first attempt in a front-wheel drive car at the Speedway, and it garnered him a solid front row starting position. Woodbury's spot on the pole was short-lived, however. Leon Duray in the Miller Special took to the track a short time after Woodbury. Duray smashed the one-lap track record on his second lap with a speed of 123.203 mph. His four-lap average of 122.391 mph was also a new track record, and he secured the pole position.

The most serious incident of the afternoon involved 1925 winner Peter DePaolo. During his qualifying attempt, going into turn three on the first lap, the car went out of control, and flipped over at least three times. DePaolo was thrown from the vehicle, then the car slid upside down along the bricks, ripping off the engine cowling, shearing off the carburetor, and grinding the top of the supercharger casing. The car suffered a bent rear axle, a dented nose, and other minor damage. It was determined that the crash was caused by the steering mechanism locking up. DePaolo suffered gouges to his arms, bruised legs, and cuts on his chin. Though DePaolo escaped serious injuries, he was sidelined for the remainder of the month. After the crash, the team led by chief mechanic Collon Henning Peters began repairing the car, in hopes of still qualifying with another driver.

At the end of the day, the front wheel drive machines swept the front row, and five of the top eight starting positions. A total of 19 cars had qualified, leaving 14 positions open.

 Source: The Indianapolis News

Sunday May 27
The second day of elimination trials was held on Sunday May 27. Five cars completed runs in front of a crowd estimated at 12,000–15,000 spectators. Peter Kreis was the fastest driver of the day. The field filled to 24 cars, leaving nine spots open.

Back in the garage area, the wrecked car of Peter DePaolo was being repaired. Bob McDonogh and Wilbur Shaw were being rumored as possible replacement drivers to the seat.

During the day, a tire changing contest was held between several of the pit crews. Dick Doyle and Bud Miller, servicing the car of George Souders, won the $50 top prize.

 Source: The Indianapolis News

Monday May 28
The third day of elimination trials was scheduled for Monday May 28. Although Monday was originally the final day allowed to qualify, officials announced that Tuesday afternoon and Wednesday morning may opened up due to prospects of a short field.

Clarence "C.W." Belt made history, becoming the first driver ever to qualify a V-type engine at Indianapolis.

 Source: The Indianapolis Star

Tuesday May 29
Despite a slippery track, three drivers completed qualifying attempts. Officials decided that the deadline to qualify would be set at 12 noon. Late in the afternoon Ted Miller, the relief driver for Buddy Marr, was taking practice laps in the #35 B.W. Cooke Special. Miller crashed at the south end of the track. Miller suffered a broken arm and lacerations, and was taken to the hospital. The car was badly damaged. The crew would work into the night to try to repair the car, but ran out of time, and withdrew on race morning.

 Source: The Indianapolis News The Indianapolis Star

Wednesday May 30
Two drivers, Wilbur Shaw and Jimmy Hill, received permission to qualify their cars at 5:00 a.m. on race morning. However, only Shaw took to the track. Shaw put Peter DePaolo's car in the field, a car repaired after the crash on Saturday. DePaolo was brought to the track by an ambulance, and cheered on the team lying on a stretcher trackside.

During practice runs just before the race, L. L. Corum and Dutch Bauman crashed their cars. Corum crashed in turn three. Bauman lost control in turn two and wrecked, but was not injured. Both cars were too damaged to race and both cars were withdrawn before the race started.

Starting grid

Qualified cars withdrawn
 Buddy Marr  (#35) – Practice crash May 29
 Dutch Bauman (#18) – Practice crash May 30; drove relief during the race for Tony Gulotta
 L. L. Corum (#17) – Practice crash May 30

Alternates
 None

Failed to qualify
 Jimmy Hill (#31) – Did not qualify
 Peter DePaolo – Crash during qualifying, injured
 Kelly Petillo (#29) – Practice crash
 Chet Miller (#35) – Practice crash
 Herman Schurch (#37) – Engine threw a rod
 Shorty Cantlon (#36) – Did not arrive; drove relief during the race for Henry Kohlert
 Prince Ghica-Cantacuzino (#42) – Did not arrive
 Bill Spence; drove relief during the race for Billy Arnold
 Phil Shafer

Race summary

Morning rain threatened to postpone the start of the race, scheduled for 10:00 a.m. central standard time. The first shower came through the area at 6:30 a.m., followed by another brief shower at 8:30 a.m. About fifteen minutes later, the rain stopped and the track began to dry. Changes to the starting lineup shuffled the grid Wednesday morning. With Wilbur Shaw putting the DePaolo car in the field, his car was placed at the rear of the field. Meanwhile, three cars were withdrawn on race morning due to crashes. Buddy Marr's car, wrecked on Tuesday, was not repaired in enough time and was scratched. L. L. Corum and Dutch Bauman both suffered crashes during practice runs early Wednesday morning, and both were withdrawn. Both crashes were blamed on the damp conditions. Corum was not seriously injured, and planned to drive relief for other cars during the race.

Jimmy Hill was unable to qualify, and there were no alternates, so the 33-car field would be short by four cars. Only 29 cars lined up in the grid to take the starter's flag.

Start
The track was still damp, but officials deemed it adequately dry for racing. The sun had come out, and the brick surface was drying quickly. With rain showers holding off, pace car driver Joe Dawson led the field around for one warm up lap. The field received the red starter's flag, and the race started on time.

Leon Duray grabbed the lead from the pole position at the start. The first lap was run at 113.279 mph, and Duray held a four car-length lead at the conclusion of the first lap. Cliff Woodbury ran second with Cliff Bergere in third. Benny Shoaff (lap 3) made a pit stop to adjust the distributor, and Fred Comer (lap 4) was also in the pits to change a tire.

Russ Snowberger was the first car out of the race, suffering a broken supercharger. Then, after starting in the outside of the front row, Cliff Bergere was out on lap 6 with a broken distributor shaft.

First half
Leon Duray dominated the early stages of the race. His average speed after 20 laps (50 miles) was 107.078 mph – over a mile per hour faster than the previous year. With Bergere out, Tony Gulotta moved up to second place, Babe Stapp was in third, Louis Schneider in fourth, and Jimmy Gleason was in fifth. Cliff Woodbury was forced to make a pit stop to change spark plugs. He lost nearly three minutes, and fell two laps down.

On lap 35, Benny Shoaff hit an oil slick in the south end of the track and spun out. The car crashed into the outside wall, rebounded, and came to rest facing the opposite direction. Shoaff's suffered a bloody nose, but no major injuries. Shoaff headed back to the pits, and would later drive relief for Fred Frame. Wilbur Shaw, the last qualifier who put his car in the field just that morning, was never a factor. Starting last (29th) in the same car that Peter DePaolo wrecked just days earlier, he lasted only 42 laps. He was another victim of broken timing gears. Shaw returned to the pits, and stood by to drive relief.

At the 100 mile mark (40 laps), Duray continued to lead, with Gulotta in second. Duray and Babe Stapp traded the lead for a few laps, but soon after Duray began to fade. After leading 59 of the first 62 laps, Duray's car was beginning to suffer overheating problems and he began to slip in the standings.

Defending race winner George Souders came to the lead on lap 63, and led for 16 laps. Souders reported that his car was difficult to handle, but he was able to run a consistent pace and stay near the front of the field. Cliff Woodbury, who started in the middle of the front row and had been plagued with mechanical problems early on, dropped out with 55 laps completed due to broken timing gears.

On lap 80 (200 miles) first-year starter Louis Meyer had charged up to fourth position.

As the race approached the halfway point, it was Jimmy Gleason (who started deep in the field), that was now the fastest car on the track. Gleason took the lead from Babe Stapp on lap 83, and set out to lead over the next 100 miles.

A leaking gasoline line on Ray Keech's car was beginning to cause the car to lose fuel pressure. Keech handed the car over to relief driver Wilbur Shaw, but Shaw did not last very long with burns on his leg due to the leaking fuel. Keech got back in the car, and pushed on.

Second half
Leon Duray's day finally came to an end after 133 laps. The car went out with overheating trouble while Cliff Woodbury was behind the wheel. Jimmy Gleason led until a pit stop on lap 135. He handed the car over to Russ Snowberger who drove relief for the next 13 laps. Snowberger maintained the lead in Gleason's car.

Ira Hall crashed out after competing 115 laps. Lou Wilson took over as relief driver for Louis Schneider. Then Scheinder himself got behind the wheel of Lou Moore's car. Both drivers finished the remainder of the race that way.

The final 100 miles was set to be a three-car battle between the cars of Jimmy Gleason, Tony Gulotta, and the steady but gaining Louis Meyer. Louis Schneider, now driving Lou Moore's car, was also inching closer to the leaders.

Shortly after 2:00 p.m., when the leaders had just passed the 400-mile mark (lap 160), a light rain began to fall. Officials put out the yellow flag and the drivers were instructed to proceed with caution. Officials contemplated halting the race (as has happened two years earlier) for safety reasons, but the shower was very brief. After only a few laps under yellow, the field went back to racing. At that moment, on his 162nd lap, Earl Devore skidded coming out of the north turns due to the wet conditions and eventually crashed into the outside wall in turn one. The fuel tank was crushed, and Devore was out of the race.

Finish
With twenty laps to go, Tony Gulotta led Jimmy Gleason and Louis Meyer. A margin of only 2.04 seconds separated 1st-2nd-3rd place. On lap 181, Gulotta began slowing down and stalled in turn three. A tiny leak in the fuel tank was causing his fuel pressure to drop, and his fuel line was clogged. Gulotta's crew would need an hour-long pit stop to make repairs. Gulotta and Dutch Bauman took turns nursing the car around to 10th-place finish. Meyer took the lead on lap 182, but Gleason was in second, and was in close contention.

On lap 195, Gleason headed for the pits to take on water for the radiator. A crew member missed the radiator and accidentally doused the car's magneto with water. The engine was ruined with a cracked water jacket as well, and Gleason was out of the race in sight of a chance for victory. Louis Meyer cruises at a steady pace to victory, winning by a little less than one lap margin over a charging Louis Schneider (in Lou Moore's car). Meyer is credited as a being a rookie winner, since his previous experience in the 1927 race was only in a relief driver role. Meyer made only one pit stop, a routine stop for oil, fuel, and to change two tires.

Ray Keech, despite bad burns on his leg, remarkably comes home fourth. All three cars of the front row dropped out, and yet again, the supercharged front-engine machines fail to achieve victory. The highest finishing front wheel drive car was Babe Stapp in 6th place.
 Sources: The Indianapolis News 500 Miles To Go

Box score

Statistics

Broadcasting
The race was carried live on radio on WKBF-AM, in a partnership arranged with the Indianapolis News. The broadcast began at 9:30 a.m. local time, and was about six hours in duration. It was the fourth consecutive year the race was being carried on the radio through this format. WFBM also picked up the broadcast. The broadcast originated from the Pagoda, with microphones also set up in the pit area. The booth announcing staff was led by Chris Albion. John Mannix led the pit reporting crew.

For the first time ever, NBC came on air for live national coverage of the final hour of the race. At approximately 2:10 p.m., anchor Graham McNamee's call was picked up on WKBF and numerous other NBC affiliates across the country.

Notes

Works cited
 Indianapolis 500 History: Race & All-Time Stats – Official Site
 1928 International 500 Mile Sweepstakes at ChampCarStats.com

References

Indianapolis 500 races
Indianapolis 500
Indianapolis 500
1928 in American motorsport
May 1928 sports events